is a Japanese musical film starring Ayaka Miyoshi. It was released on August 16, 2019.

Plot
After she is hypnotized, Shizuka Suzuki sings and dances every time she hears music. She tries to find her hypnotizer to break the curse.

Cast
 Ayaka Miyoshi as Shizuka Suzuki
 Yuu Yashiro as Chie Saito
 Chay as Yoko Yamamoto
 Takahiro Miura as Ryosuke Murakami
 Tsuyoshi Muro as Yoshio Watanabe
 Akira Takarada as Machin Ueda
 Haruki Takagi as Debt collector

Production
Principal photography began in July 2018 and filming wrapped up in September 2018.

References

External links
 
  

2019 films
2010s Japanese-language films
Japanese musical comedy films
2010s musical comedy films
Warner Bros. films
Aeon Entertainment films
2010s Japanese films